Stanisława Pietruszczak-Wąchała (born 8 May 1953) is a Polish speed skater. She competed in the women's 500 metres at the 1976 Winter Olympics.

References

1953 births
Living people
Polish female speed skaters
Olympic speed skaters of Poland
Speed skaters at the 1976 Winter Olympics
People from Tomaszów Mazowiecki
Sportspeople from Łódź Voivodeship